Onceropyga anelia is a species of moth in the family Zygaenidae. It is found in Australia in eastern Queensland and the northern parts of eastern New South Wales.

The length of the forewings is 6–6.5 mm for males and 7 mm for females. The head, thorax and abdomen are dark grey brown dorsally and creamy white ventrally. The upperside of the forewings is blackish brown with some spots and streaks of variable shape and consisting of creamy white scales. The underside is considerably paler proximally. The hindwings are opaque and brownish black on the upperside. The underside is paler proximally.

The larvae feed on Cissus antarctica. They are pale yellowish green with a reddish dorsal pattern. Pupation takes place in a flat, oval, white cocoon.

References

Moths described in 1906
Procridinae